This is a list of seasons played by Burton Albion Football Club in English football, from 1950 to 2020.

Seasons

Notes
Source: 

Seasons
 
Burton Albion